William A. Flanagan is American politician and attorney who served as the 42nd Mayor of Fall River, Massachusetts from 2010 to 2014. A member of the Democratic Party, Flanagan served as an intern in the city of Taunton's legal department, later joining the Bristol County District Attorney's office as an Assistant District Attorney. He served as Assistant City Solicitor of Taunton before being elected Mayor of Fall River in 2009, succeeding Robert Correia, who was defeated in a preliminary election.

Early life and law career
Flanagan was born May 11, 1980 in Fall River, Massachusetts. Flanagan graduated from Diman Regional Vocational Technical High School in 1998, the University of Massachusetts Dartmouth, and Roger Williams University School of Law. During law school, he interned in Taunton's legal department. He went on to serve as the assistant attorney for Taunton, advising the city's mayor, council, department heads, and police and fire chiefs.

Political career
In 2001, while a student at UMass Dartmouth, Flanagan ran unsuccessfully for the Fall River School Committee, placing tenth in a field of eleven. He made a second unsuccessful run in 2003, placing last in a field of eleven.

In September 2009, Flanagan announced he was running for Mayor of Fall River. As a candidate in the September 15th primary, Flanagan placed second a field of six, including incumbent Mayor Robert Correia and City Councillor Cathy Ann Viveiros. He defeated Viveiros in the November runoff election with more than 60% of the vote. He was reelected in 2011 in a rematch with Viveiros, once again pulling 60% of the vote. In November 2013, Flanagan achieved his largest victory against challenger Joseph Carvalho; winning 68% of the popular vote and taking all 29 of Fall River's precincts.

Flanagan lost his seat in a recall election on December 16, 2014 after 70% of voters chose to recall the Mayor and he placed second to Bristol County District Attorney Samuel Sutter in the eight-way contest that followed and was removed from office. The recall election was the first successful recall election within the Commonwealth of Massachusetts.

Mayor of Fall River
As Mayor, Flanagan finalized the long-awaited agreement with UMass Dartmouth to create a Fall River BioPark, and brought as many as 8,000 jobs to Fall River. He also brought TPI Composites, a green innovation company, back to Fall River and crafted new partnerships with Bristol Community College and University of Massachusetts Dartmouth to expand workforce training programs.

Electoral history

References

External links
Personal website
Mayoral-election-results-Polls-close-at-8-p-m

Living people
Mayors of Fall River, Massachusetts
American people of Azorean descent
1980 births